Acheloma (also known as Trematops milleri)  is an extinct genus of temnospondyl that lived during the Early Permian. The type species is A. cumminsi.

History of study 
Acheloma was named by Edward Drinker Cope in 1882 based on a partial skull with associated postcranial elements from the Arroyo Formation of Texas; the specimen is currently reposited at the American Museum of Natural History in New York. Subsequent discoveries of large trematopids from the Arroyo Formation were named as different species of Trematops (T. milleri, T. willistoni), but these have since been synonymized with Acheloma cumminsi. Trematops stonei from the Washington Formation of Ohio and Trematops thomasi from Oklahoma have also been synonymized with A. cumminsi. A second species of Acheloma was described by Polley & Reisz (2011) from the Richards Spur locality in Oklahoma.

Anatomy 
Schoch & Milner (2014) provide nine characters in their diagnosis of Acheloma: (1) toothed crest on the vomer extending medial to the internal naris; (2) constricted otic notch with nearly horizontal ventral margin; (3) preorbital region twice as long as the skull table; (4) naris twice as long as the orbit; (5) posterior skull table wide and posterolaterally expanded; (6) skull margin widens at level of and posterior to orbit; (7) palatine and ectopterygoid with tall fangs; (8) large intervomerine fenestra; and (9) choana elongate and curved with a Y-shaped contour. Acheloma cumminsi and A. dunni are distinguished by the purported absence of lateral exposures of the palatine (LEP) and the ectopterygoid (LEE) in A. cumminsi, but these exposures were subsequently identified following re-examination of the holotype of this taxon.

Ecology 
Various analyses have confirmed hypotheses that Acheloma was a terrestrial temnospondyl.

Phylogeny 
The following cladogram shows the phylogenetic position of Acheloma, from Polley & Reisz, 2011.

References

Dissorophids
Trematopids
Cisuralian temnospondyls of North America
Prehistoric amphibian genera
Taxa named by Edward Drinker Cope
Fossil taxa described in 1882